Red gravy may refer to:

Red-eye gravy
Creole sauce
An Italian-American term for a tomato sauce